Jan Borukowski of Bielin (1524–1584) was the Bishop
of Przemyśl, and was the royal secretary of Poland from 1553. In
1569, he signed the act of annexation of Podlaskie, Volhynia and Kyiv to the kingdom during Sejm in Lublin.

References

1524 births
1584 deaths
Roman Catholic bishops of Przemyśl
Crown Vice-Chancellors